The 2009–10 season was the third consecutive season in League One since being promoted via the League Two play-offs in 2006–07 played by Bristol Rovers Football Club, a professional football club based in Bristol, England.

Season Summary 
Having finished 11th in the previous season, a fine start to the 2009–10 season meant Rovers were 3rd place at the start of October, despite the sale of top-scorer Rickie Lambert to Southampton. A run of five successive defeats, however, including 5–1 and 4–0 defeats to Norwich City and Leeds United respectively, saw Rovers drop out of the play-off places. The side finished the season in 11th place after gaining only one point from their last six games.

Competitions

League One

Table

Results

FA Cup

Football League Cup

Football League Trophy

Squad

References

External links
 Bristol Rovers F.C. Official Website
 Bristol Evening Post
 Soccerbase – Results | Stats | Transfers

Bristol Rovers F.C. seasons
Bristol Rovers